The Hough Graduate School of Business is the home to the graduate business programs of the Warrington College of Business at the University of Florida. All programs are accredited by the Association to Advance Collegiate Schools of Business.

William R. Hough
The school is named after William R. Hough of St. Petersburg, Fla. He was the founder of the investment firm bearing his name and is an alumnus of the College's first MBA class in 1948. Hough donated $30 million to the College in 2007, which was the largest private gift ever received by the University of Florida at that time.

The funds established an endowment to support teaching, academic programs and enhancements in the Hough Graduate School of Business and provided a lead gift to construct a new building to house the graduate business programs named after Mr. Hough himself. The gift is also eligible for matching funds from the State of Florida Major Gifts Trust Fund and from the Alec P. Courtelis Facilities Enhancement Challenge Grant Program, potentially increasing the total value of the gift to $50 million.

Programs

UF MBA
 Full-time, two-year program
 Full-time, one-year – All Majors
 Full-time, one-year – Business Majors
 Full-time Dual Degrees
 Executive MBA
 Professional MBA
 Professional MBA in South Florida
 Online MBA
Specialized Master's
 Master of International Business
 Master of Science in Information Systems and Operations Management
 Master of Science in Entrepreneurship
 Master of Science in Finance
 Master of Science in Management
 Master of Science in Real Estate
Ph.D.
 Ph.D. in Business Administration – Accounting
 Ph.D. in Business Administration – Information Systems and Operations Management
 Ph.D. in Business Administration – Finance and Real Estate
 Ph.D. in Business Administration – Management
 Ph.D. in Business Administration – Marketing
Doctorate
 Doctor of Business Administration (DBA) program
Post-Doctoral
 Post-Doctoral Bridge (PDB) program
Certificates
 Certificate in Tourism and Hospitality Business Management
Minors
 Minor in Real Estate
 Information Systems and Operations Management Minor (not available to ISOM students)
 Auditing Minor (for MS-ISOM students only)
 Graduate Minor in Entrepreneurship (for non-business, graduate students only)

Rankings
Hough Graduate School
Full-Time MBA
 25th overall by the U.S. News & World Report, 2020
 1st in Florida by the U.S. News & World Report, 2020
 21st (Global) Economist 'WhichMBA' 2018
 14th (Global) QS Top MBA Rankings 2019
Online MBA
 4th Best Online MBA Program by the U.S. News & World Report, 2020
 5th in Admissions Selectivity by the U.S. News & World Report, 2018
 5th Best Online MBA Program by The Princeton Review, 2018
 7th (Global) Online MBA, Financial Times, 2018
Executive MBA
 No. 10 among public programs by Ivy Exec, 2018

Hough Hall

Named after alumnus William R. Hough, Hough Hall is a 70,000-square-foot facility that was completed in 2010 to serve as a home for all graduate programs. 
This state-of-the-art building provides 17 breakout rooms, two lounge areas, 400 lockers and showers. It's all focused on improving the student experience. The classrooms have modern instructional technology to fit our curriculum about the ever-changing business world.

The heart of Hough Hall is its open court. The glass curtain wall on the north end allows indirect light to permeate the entire building. It's strategically designed to create an interplay between the inside of the building and those who are outside. The inviting construction generates a welcoming atmosphere.

The facility also houses career development and counseling centers, academic program offices, and a recruitment suite, which works daily to bring some of the nation's top companies and recruiters to the Warrington campus.

References

External links
Official website
U.S. News & World Report profile on Hough
Forbes profile on Hough
UF MBA

Business schools in Florida
University of Florida